Daniele Scattina (born 16 May 1967 at La Spezia, Italy) is an actor, director and writer. Graduate at "Il Mulino di Flora" theater school in Bologna directed by Perla Peragallo and Leo de Berardinis.

Performances 

April 2009
Actor and director for "La neve era sporca", original music by Gianluca Attanasio
Teatro in Scatola and Teatro Aldo Fabrizi di Morlupo Rome

June 2008
Actor and director for "Caligola 2000" by the Nobel Prize Albert Camus
Teatro dell'Orologio (Roma)

Maj 2008
Protagonist and director for "Sol'Amleto" inspired by William Shakespeare
Teatro Aldo Fabrizi di Morlupo (Rome) 
 
March 2008
Director for "Clan Macbeth" inspired by William Shakespeare
Teatro Agorà (Roma)

August 2007 – August 2008
Actor, director and writer of "AK-47 – Questo silenzio atroce", original music by Gianluca Attanasio
The piece is winner of the XXXIII edition "Prize Fondi la Pastora" – Teatro Tor di nona (Rome)
– In Czech republic, about "Festival Internazionale delle Avanguardie Black
Theater of Praga;
– in Sicily at: Palermo, Agrigento, Alcamo e Teatro comunale di Partanna (Trapani);
– in Basilicata a: Potenza e Vaglio;
– in Liguria presso il Teatro Palmaria (La Spezia);
– nel Lazio presso: il Teatro Aldo Fabrizi di Morlupo (Roma), il Teatro di Terra (Velletri) ed il
Festival del Teatro città di Fiano Romano (Roma).
Daniele Scattina – www.metateatro.com Pagina 2 di 4

August–December 2006
director for “Clown-visioni parziali sul ‘900” inspired by Luigi Pirandello and Nove, with Dell'Atti
Piemonte, Liguria, Toscana, Abruzzo, Umbria.

Maj 2006
Actor, director and writer for "AK-47 – Questo silenzio atroce", original music by Gianluca Attanasio
Teatro Colosseo (Roma)

February 2006
Director for "Clown-visioni parziali sul '900" inspired by Luigi PirandelloPirandello and Nove, with actress Dell'Atti
Teatro Colosseo (Roma)

March–September 2005
Director for "L'Animalità di Macbeth" inspired by W. Shakespeare 
Abruzzo, Basilicata – XII Festival Internazionale de L'Avana

January–July 2005
Director for "Deutsche Requiem" inspired by Jorge Luis Borges, with A. Dell'Atti
Torino, Milano, Perugia, Roma, Pescara e Lecco

November–December 2004
Director for "Metropolis" by various authors
Teatro dei Satiri (Roma)

July 2004
Director for "L'Animalità di Macbeth", by W. Shakespeare
Teatro India (Roma)

June 2004
Director for "Romeo e Giulietta" by W. Shakespeare, music by Gianluca Attanasio
Festival di Primavera – Villa Pamphili (Roma)

April 2004
Director for "Deutsche Requiem"  inspired by Jorge Luis Borges, con A. Dell'Atti
Teatro Duse – Agrate Brianza (Milano) – Vincitore del premio "Arcobaleno”

February–March 2004
Director for "L'Animalità di Macbeth" by W. Shakespeare
Lazio, Umbria e Marche
Luglio-Novembre 2003
Director for "Romeo and Juliet by W. Shakespeare
Lazio

February 2003
director and actor for "Sol'Amleto, ovvero studi di attimi di una fobia del vivere" by W. Shakespeare, music by Gianluca Attanasio
Teatro del Centro (Roma)

September 2002
Director for "L'Animalità di Macbeth" (III Variazione) da W. Shakespeare
Teatro Colosseo (Rome)

Daniele Scattina – www.metateatro.com Pagina 3 di 4

Maj-July 2002
Director for "La Commedia nella Tempesta" by W. Shakespeare
Teatro dell'Orologio (Roma)

February 2002
Director for "Riccardo III" by W. Shakespeare

April–November 2001
Director for "L'Animalità di Macbeth" by W. Shakespeare
Teatri: dell’Orologio, Belli e Colosseo 

Genuary 2001
director “Catene” da autori vari

from October 2000 to today
He is director of “Teatro delle ombre”'s company

February-Maj 2000
Actor as Agamennone in “Come una rivista” from Aeschylus to Totò, directed by da Leo de Berardinis

April–June 1999
Actor as Otello in "Come una rivista" from Aeschylus to Totò, directed by Leo de Bernardinis

July 1998
Protagonist and director for "Macbeth" by W. Shakespeare, at Courtyard Theatre in London,
called from Peter Hall Company

November-Genuary 1998
Protagonist and director for "Sol'Amleto" by W. Shakespeare
Won as better piece and better actor at "Lavori in Corso" competition, organized by dall'ETI

Maj-September 1996
Protagonist with G. Albertazzi and E. Gardini for "Macbeth" by W. Shakespeare, directed by F. Balestra

March–July 1996
Protagonist and director for "Deliri" da autori vari

Juny–August 1995
He is Hamm in "Finale di partita" by Samuel Beckett, directed by Simona Generali

April-Maj 1995
he is Jean in "La signorina Julie" by Strindberg, directed by Chiara Labianca

March–Juny 1993
he is Ariel in "Epifanie di una Tempesta" by W. Shakespeare, directed by da R. Latini

September 1991 – October 1995
Collaborations as actor with the director D. Valmaggi, carrying on:
– il poeta Marino in “Roma a Corte” by various authors;
– Don Giovanni in “Festa di Don Giovanni” by Molière
– Dante in "I migliori attori del Mondo" by various authors.

Awards 

1996: "Prize ETI", Rome, 1996 as actor for "Sol'Amleto”
2002: "Prize Viviani", Napoli, as actor for "Macbeth”
2005: "Prize Arcobaleno", Milan, as actor and better show for "Deutsche Requiem";
2007: "Prieze Fondi la Pastora", Rome, as better show for "AK-47 – Questo silenzio atroce", original music by Gianluca Attanasio

References 

review Ak-47
review
review
review

1967 births
Living people